= CityDisc =

Swiss media retail franchise

- Industry: Audiovisual media sales
- Headquarters: Switzerland
- Parent: Carrefour (pre-2000); Directmedia (post-2000)
- Website: citydisc.ch

CityDisc is a music, video, video game and book franchise with 33 locations throughout Switzerland. The first locales primarily featured music; as a result, CityDisc is mostly known for its large selection of music, including rarer items such as oldies collections, local folk compilations and video game soundtracks.

The video section is mostly in DVD format and includes adult titles. Blank audio cassettes, CDs, VHS cassettes and DVDs are available for purchase.

The video game section features PC, console and portable titles, in PAL format. The latest consoles are also available for purchase.

Books are for the most part sold in the Swiss German locations, although occasional bestsellers, posters and calendars are available everywhere.

== History ==
It was previously owned by Carrefour, who sold it in 2000 to the online distributor brand Directmedia for an undisclosed price.
